Güajiro (pronounced, ‘wah-HEE-roh’) are a Hialeah, Florida-based rock band, composed of members Jorge Gonzalez Graupera (bass, backing vocals), William Lopez (guitar, lead vocals), Douglas Mackinnon (drums, percussion) and David Santos (guitar). They are signed to I Scream Records. They were the US representatives of the Rally MTV reality TV series.

History
The band was formed by Lopez and Mackinnon in early 2005 as a hobby after spending years away from the music scene (Mackinnon played in  The Vandals and Slapshot. Lopez was the singer of Friction Wheel). By mid-2005 a self-titled EP was recorded and released by California label Long Beach Records. They recruited bass player/singer Jorges Gonzalez Graupera and later, guitar player David Santos. Shortly after that in June, the band was invited by MTV to participate in a reality TV show called Rally MTV which followed five bands racing across South America.

Discography

Guajiro -  (2005) Self titled -  EP

 Produced by Jorge “Tereso” Correa
 Mixed by Darian Rundall
 Recorded at Espiral Recording, Miami, Florida
 Mastered by Don Tyler at Precision Mastering, Hollywood, CA

Material Subversivo – (2007) – LP

 Produced by Darian Rundall
 Mixed by Darian Rundall
 Recorded at Espiral Recording, Miami, Fl
 Mastered by Gene Grimaldi at Oasis Mastering, Burbank, CA
 Featured musicians: Julio “El Peregrino” Martinez – Tres on “Soy Guajiro Part I & II, Randy Bradbury (bass) on “Dos Principes”, Chris Bradford – Acoustic Guitars on “Dos Principes”, Aruan y Arelan Torres – Vocals on “ Soy Guajiro Part I” and “Santa Fe”, Percussion (Timbata) on “Soy Guajiro Part I”, “Santa Fe”, “Mulatona” and “En Bori”, Gil Joker – Vocals on “Soy Guajiro Part I & II” and “Bandera”, Harold Bosch– Vocals on “Delinquente”, Frank Lopez – Vocals on ”Delinquente”

Line-up

This is considered to be the essential line-up of Guajiro. It is with these members that the band has achieved artistic and commercial success:

 Jorge Gonzalez Graupera – bass, backing vocals
 William Lopez – guitar, lead vocals, rusty trombone
 Douglas Mackinnon – drums, percussion
 David Santos – Guitar

Other members

 Ariel Gonzalez – guitar
 Luis Castellanos – bass
 Joe Koontz - guitar

References

External links
 Guajiro's page on I Scream Records site
 The Miami Herald - "Material Subversivo" review
 Miami New Times - "Hialeah Hardcore"

Rock music groups from Florida
Musical groups established in 2005